María Gabriela Díaz (born January 2, 1981 in Alta Gracia, Córdoba) is an Argentine professional BMX cyclist. Emerging as the world's most decorated female BMX rider in history, Diaz has claimed multiple Argentine national titles, six Pan American championship titles, and five medals (three golds, one silver, and one bronze) in women's elite category at the UCI World Championships. She also won two medals, including a prestigious gold, in the same category at the Pan American Games (2007 and 2011), and later represented her nation Argentina at the 2008 Summer Olympics.

Diaz sought sporting headlines at the UCI BMX World Championships, where she claimed a total of five medals (three golds, one silver, and one bronze) in the women's elite category, making her the world's most decorated female rider of all time. At the 2007 Pan American Games in Rio de Janeiro, Brazil, Diaz powered her lead over the eight-strong female squad on the final stretch to take home the first gold for Argentina in the women's BMX category, finishing ahead of host nation's Ana Flávia Sgobin.

Diaz qualified for the Argentine squad in women's BMX cycling at the 2008 Summer Olympics in Beijing by receiving one of the nation's two available berths based on her top-ten performance from the UCI BMX World Rankings. After grabbing a fifth seed on the morning prelims with a time of 37.590 and then mounting a third spot in her semifinal heat with 13 placing points, Diaz narrowly missed out the podium by more than a second with a fifth-place finish in 39.747.

At the 2011 Pan American Games in Guadalajara, Mexico, Diaz could not defend her women's BMX title with a bronze-medal time in 42.971, holding off her sister Mariana on the final turn by a two-second advantage.

Diaz also sought her bid for the 2012 Summer Olympics in London, but she finished sixth in her quarterfinal heat at the 2012 UCI BMX World Championships in Birmingham, England, failing to advance further to the latter rounds for a coveted Olympic spot.

References

External links
 
 
 
 
 
 
 

1981 births
Living people
Argentine female cyclists
BMX riders
Olympic cyclists of Argentina
Cyclists at the 2008 Summer Olympics
Cyclists at the 2016 Summer Olympics
Pan American Games gold medalists for Argentina
Pan American Games bronze medalists for Argentina
Pan American Games medalists in cycling
Cyclists at the 2007 Pan American Games
Cyclists at the 2011 Pan American Games
Medalists at the 2007 Pan American Games
Medalists at the 2011 Pan American Games
South American Games silver medalists for Argentina
South American Games bronze medalists for Argentina
South American Games medalists in cycling
Competitors at the 2010 South American Games
Competitors at the 2014 South American Games
UCI BMX World Champions (elite women)
Sportspeople from Córdoba Province, Argentina